Charaxes balfouri is a butterfly in the family Nymphalidae. It is found on Socotra. The habitat consists of forests at altitudes between 500 and 1,000 meters.

Description
A full description is given by Rothschild, W and Jordan, K. (1900). Novitates Zoologicae  7:287-524.  page 361-362 (for terms see Novitates Zoologicae  Volume 5:545-601  )

Taxonomy
Charaxes varanes group. Subgenus Stonehamia (Hadrodontes)

The group members are 
Charaxes varanes
Charaxes fulvescens very similar to varanes
Charaxes acuminatus very pointed forewing
Charaxes balfouri
Charaxes analava
Charaxes nicati
Charaxes bertrami perhaps subspecies of varanes
Charaxes saperanus
Charaxes defulvata

Etymology
The name honours the collector Isaac Bayley Balfour.

References

External links
Charaxes balfouri images at Consortium for the Barcode of Life 
African Butterfly Database Range map  via search

Butterflies described in 1881
balfourii
Endemic fauna of Socotra
Taxa named by Arthur Gardiner Butler